Aqa Bil-e Sofla (also Romanized as Āqā Bīl-e Soflá; also known as Āqā Bīl-e Pā’īn) is a village in Balaband Rural District, in the Central District of Fariman County, Razavi Khorasan Province, Iran. At the 2006 census, its population was 64, in 14 families.

See also 

 List of cities, towns and villages in Razavi Khorasan Province

References 

Populated places in Fariman County